Peremyshliany Raion was a raion in Lviv Oblast in western Ukraine. Its administrative center was the city of Peremyshliany. The raion was abolished on 18 July 2020 as part of the administrative reform of Ukraine, which reduced the number of raions of Lviv Oblast to seven. The area of Peremyshliany Raion was merged into Lviv Raion.

It was established in 1939.

At the time of disestablishment, the raion consisted of two hromadas:
 Bibrka urban hromada with the administration in the city of Bibrka;
 Peremyshliany urban hromada with the administration in Peremyshliany.

See also
 Administrative divisions of Lviv Oblast

References

Former raions of Lviv Oblast
1939 establishments in Ukraine
Ukrainian raions abolished during the 2020 administrative reform